Francesco Illy ( (7 October 1892 – 1956) was a Hungarian accountant, bookkeeper, businessman, philanthropist. He founded illy and invented various coffee machinery.

Biography

Illy was born to a middle-class family in Temesvár, Kingdom of Hungary (now Timișoara, Romania). His father, János Illy, was a carpenter. His mother, Aloisia Rössler, was Danube Swabian. He studied economics in Temesvár. After secondary school, he moved to Vienna, where he worked for two big Transylvanian companies. At the age of 22, he was conscripted into the Austro-Hungarian Army, and served from 1914 at almost every front of the First World War, including at the Battle of Kraśnik and the Battles of the Isonzo.

After the war, he stayed with his sister in Trieste, where he soon married a Triestine woman. He found work with companies dealing with cocoa and coffee roasting. He later invented his own method for maintaining the quality of freshly roasted coffee, so it could be delivered to other locations rather than roasting it on site. He formed a partnership with the local coffee manufacturers Hausbrandt.

In 1933 Illy founded illycaffè, which invented the first automatic coffee machine that substituted pressurized water for steam. The Illetta became the predecessor of today's espresso machine.

His son, the food chemist Ernesto Illy (1925–2008) took over the management of the coffee company, which is now in the hands of the third generation Illys.

References

Italian people of Hungarian descent
Hungarian inventors
19th-century Italian businesspeople
Businesspeople in coffee
Businesspeople from Trieste
Businesspeople from Timișoara
1892 births
1956 deaths
Austro-Hungarian people
Hungarian industrialists
Hungarian chief executives
19th-century Hungarian businesspeople
Illycaffè
Engineers from Trieste
20th-century Italian inventors
Austro-Hungarian inventors
20th-century Hungarian inventors